Henning William Percy Hamilton (15 August 1921 – 12 December 2007) was a Swedish Army officer and equestrian. He competed in the mixed dressage at the 1964 Summer Olympics and finished ninth individually and fifth with the Swedish team. He served as the Swedish Olympic flag bearer at those Games.

Hamilton was ryttmästare in the Swedish Army.

References

External links
 

1921 births
2007 deaths
Swedish Army officers
Swedish dressage riders
Olympic equestrians of Sweden
Swedish male equestrians
Equestrians at the 1964 Summer Olympics